William Richard Bawlf (January 17, 1881 – January 6, 1972) was a Canadian ice hockey player in the early 1900s.

At the time of the 1911 Canadian Census, he was married to Mary Ada Bawlf, and had three children, Nicholas William, Rowena Eleanor and Robert Samuel. His wife died in 1943, and he died in 1972.

Playing career
Born in Winnipeg, Manitoba, Canada, Billy joined the Winnipeg Victorias in 1900. He played two seasons for the club, including their Stanley Cup win, in 1901, although he did not play in the challenge series. In 1902, he joined the Winnipeg Rowing Club team for two seasons. The club played an unsuccessful challenge of the Ottawa Silver Seven in 1904.

His cousin Nick Bawlf (1884–1947) played briefly with the Montreal Canadiens and Montreal Wanderers in the National Hockey Association.

References

1881 births
1972 deaths
Ice hockey people from Winnipeg
Stanley Cup champions
Winnipeg Victorias players
Canadian ice hockey forwards